Mythimna pyrausta is a species of moth of the  family Noctuidae. It is found in most countries of central, southern and eastern Africa, including islands in the Atlantic and Indian Ocean.

It has a length of approx. 15 mm = wingspan 28-30mm.

References

Mythimna (moth)
Moths of Madagascar
Moths of the Comoros
Moths of Mauritius
Moths of Réunion
Moths of Sub-Saharan Africa
Lepidoptera of Uganda
Moths described in 1913